The Book of Swords is an anthology of fantasy stories collected by American author and anthologist Gardner Dozois, released in print on October 10, 2017, and in audiobook on October 19, 2017.

Background
George R. R. Martin clarified in January 2017 that unlike his previous anthology collaborations with Dozois, he was merely a contributor to The Book of Swords, which was edited by Dozois alone. Dozois notes in his introduction that this anthology is set to focus on the fantasy sub-genre of sword and sorcery, which he notes has often been mischaracterised as "epic fantasy", and collected these stories to reassert and exemplify the sword and sorcery genre in its own right. He notes that the anthology is intentionally a collection of the sub-genre's stable of "classic" writers, such as Holland, Nix, Hobb and Martin, along with a range of newcomers to the genre, such as Bear, Tidhar, Liu and Lynch.

Contents
{| class="wikitable sortable"
|-
! Title
! Author
! Narrator
! Notes 
|-
| Introduction
| Gardner Dozois
| Arthur Morey
|
|-
|"The Best Man Wins"
|K.J. Parker
|John Lee
|
|-
|"Her Father's Sword"
|Robin Hobb
|Katharine McEwan
|A Realms of the Elderlings story
|-
|"The Hidden Girl"
|Ken Liu
|Kim Mai Guest
|
|-
|"The Sword of Destiny"
|Matthew Hughes
|Elliot Hill
|
|-
|""I Am a Handsome Man," said Apollo Crow"
|Kate Elliott
|Steve West
|
|-
|"The Triumph of Virtue"
|Walter Jon Williams
|Elliot Hill
|
|-
|"The Mocking Tower"
|Daniel Abraham
|Richard Brewer
|
|-
|"Hrunting"
|C. J. Cherryh
|John Lee
|Relating to the Norse mythological sword of the same name
|-
|"A Long, Cold Trail"
|Garth Nix
|Nicholas Guy Smith
|
|-
|"When I was a Highway Man"
|Ellen Kushner
|Kirby Heyborne
|
|-
|"The Smoke of Gold is Glory"
|Scott Lynch
|Ralph Lister
|
|-
|"The Colgrid Conundrum"
|Rich Larson
|Mark Deakins
|
|-
|"The King's Evil"
|Elizabeth Bear
|Julia Whelan
|
|-
|"Waterfalling"
|Lavie Tidhar
|Mark Deakins
|
|-
|"The Sword Tyraste"
|Cecelia Holland
|Steve West
|
|-
|The Sons of the Dragon'
|George R.R. Martin
|Ralph Lister
|A historical writing set in the world of A Song of Ice and Fire|}

Audiobook
The audiobook version of The Book of Swords'' was released on October 19, 2017. Its narrators include Arthur Morey, Katharine McEwan, Kim Mai Guest, Elliot Hill, Steve West, Richard Brewer, Nicholas Guy Smith, Kirby Heyborne, Ralph Lister, Mark Deakins, and Julia Whelan. This collection totals 22 hours and 13 minutes, and was produced by Random House Audio for HarperCollins Publishers.

References

Gardner Dozois anthologies
Bantam Spectra books
2017 short story collections